Octorara Farm is a historic home located at Conowingo, Cecil County, Maryland, United States.  It was built in sections dating from the period between 1775 and 1840. The main block is a -story brick structure of high style Greek Revival architecture; it was probably added to the earlier rear section around 1830–1840. The present kitchen, which constitutes the central room of the three rooms of the rear section, is the earliest section of the house, probably dates to about 1775.  Also on the property are a large four-bay fieldstone barn, a wagon shed, dairy, smokehouse, and tenant houses.

Octorara Farm was listed on the National Register of Historic Places in 1980.

References

External links
, including photo from 1978, Maryland Historical Trust

Farms on the National Register of Historic Places in Maryland
Houses in Cecil County, Maryland
Greek Revival houses in Maryland
Greek Revival architecture in Maryland
Second Empire architecture in Maryland
Houses completed in 1825
National Register of Historic Places in Cecil County, Maryland